Hauge Lutheran Church is a historic church in Kenyon Township, Goodhue County, Minnesota. 

The church was built between 1871 and 1888 1875 using stone from a nearby quarry. The congregation was incorporated in 1875 as  Hauge Evangelical Lutheran Congregation of Kenyon.  The congregation was affiliated with the Hauge Synod, one of the two primary Lutheran denominations  among Norwegian immigrants in rural Goodhue County. In 1902, parish members decided to build  a newer church in Kenyon and Hauge Lutheran church was closed. The church is maintained and occasionally used for special events.  The church was added to the National Register of Historic Places in 1980.

References

Churches in Goodhue County, Minnesota
Lutheran churches in Minnesota
Churches on the National Register of Historic Places in Minnesota
Churches completed in 1871
National Register of Historic Places in Goodhue County, Minnesota